The 2010–11 Campionato Sammarinese di Calcio season was the twenty-sixth since its establishment. The season began with the first regular season games on 17 September 2010 and ended with the play-off final in May 2011. Tre Fiori are the league champions, having won their seventh Sammarinese championship and third-in-a-row last season.

Teams

Because there is no promotion or relegation in the league, the same 15 teams who competed in the league last season competed in the league this season.
 S.P. Cailungo (Borgo Maggiore)
 S.S. Cosmos (Serravalle)
 F.C. Domagnano (Domagnano)
 S.C. Faetano (Faetano)
 S.S. Folgore Falciano Calcio (Serravalle)
 F.C. Fiorentino (Fiorentino)
 A.C. Juvenes/Dogana (Serravalle)
 S.P. La Fiorita (Montegiardino)
 A.C. Libertas (Borgo Maggiore)
 S.S. Murata (San Marino)
 S.S. Pennarossa (Chiesanuova)
 S.S. San Giovanni (Borgo Maggiore)
 S.P. Tre Fiori (Fiorentino)
 S.P. Tre Penne (Serravalle)
 S.S. Virtus (Acquaviva)

Venues
The teams do not have grounds of their own due to restricted space in San Marino. Each match was randomly assigned to one of the following grounds:
 Stadio Olimpico (Serravalle)
 Campo di Fiorentino (Fiorentino)
 Campo di Acquaviva (Chiesanuova)
 Campo di Dogana (Serravalle)
 Campo Fonte dell'Ovo (Domagnano)
 Campo di Serravalle "B" (Serravalle)

Regular season

Group A

Group B

Results
All teams played twice against the teams within their own group and once against the teams from the other group. This meant that the clubs in Group A played 20 matches each while the clubs in the Group B played 21 matches each during the regular season.

Play-off
The playoff was held in a double-eliminination format. Both group winners earned byes in the first and second round.

All times CEST

First round

Second round

Libertas were eliminated.

Third round

La Fiorita were eliminated.

Fourth round

Pennarossa were eliminated.

Semifinal

Cosmos were eliminated.

Final
The winner of the final qualifies for the first qualifying round of the 2011–12 UEFA Champions League, while the runner-up qualifies for the first qualifying round of the 2011–12 UEFA Europa League.

Top goalscorers 
Including matches played on 17 April 2011; Source: Soccerway

References 

Campionato Sammarinese di Calcio
San Marino
1